Sarah "Sari" R. Anderson (born December 30, 1978) from Carbondale, Colorado, is an American multisport and endurance athlete.

Anderson grew up in Rhode Island and played ice hockey and soccer before she moved to Colorado, where she started competing in trail running, snowshoe, and mountain biking events. She was introduced to ski mountaineer by Pete Swenson and Monique Merrill introduced in 2007. She is married with two children.

Selected results (ski mountaineering) 
 2009:
 7th, Pierra Menta, together with Monique Merrill
 2012:
 2nd, North American Championship, individual
 2nd, North American Championship, total ranking
 3rd, North American Championship, sprint

References

External links 
 Sari Anderson at SkiMountaineers.org
 Personal website

1978 births
Living people
American female ski mountaineers
Marathon mountain bikers
21st-century American women